Woodrow Sedlacek (June 7, 1919 – July 19, 2004) was an American Thoroughbred flat racing horse trainer.

Sedlacek is best remembered as the trainer of Bounding Basque with whom he won one edition of the 1983 Wood Memorial Stakes, and in 1985 the Brooklyn Handicap, the Massachusetts Handicap, and equaled the track record for 1¼ miles Meadowlands Cup.

Sedlacek started in Thoroughbred horse racing as a jockey during the 1930s. He was almost killed in a racing accident in 1937 that left him with a plate in his head. In 1945, he began working as a trainer and retired from the sport in 1997 to a home in Florida.

Sedlacek died from cancer in Ocala, Florida in 2004 at the age of 85.

References
 Thoroughbred Times 2004 obituary for Woody Sedlacek

1919 births
2004 deaths
American horse trainers
Deaths from cancer in Florida